For Macate District in Mozambique, see Macate District, Mozambique

Macate District is one of nine districts of the Santa Province in Peru.

References

Districts of the Santa Province
Districts of the Ancash Region